124th meridian may refer to:

124th meridian east, a line of longitude east of the Greenwich Meridian
124th meridian west, a line of longitude west of the Greenwich Meridian